Grupera (also known as Grupero or Onda Grupera) is a genre of Regional Mexican music. It reached the height of its popularity in the 1990s, especially in rural areas. The music has roots in the rock groups of the 1960s, but today generally consists of four or more musicians using electric guitars, keyboards and drums. The music increased in popularity in the 1980s and became commercially viable, and is now recognized in some Latin music awards ceremonies such as Lo Nuestro and The Latin Grammy Awards. Grupero artists typically perform rancheras, corridos, cumbias, charangas, ballads, boleros and chilenas/huapangos.

History
The original wave of Mexican rock bands got their start mostly with Spanish covers of popular English rock songs.  After this initial stage, they moved on to include in their repertoire traditional ranchera songs, in addition to cumbias and ballads. Thus, the 1970s saw the rise of a number of grupera bands that specialized in romantic ballads and songs that up to that point had only been sung with mariachi.

Most of the these groups had a rural origin and many previously played rock music. According to Madrid, cited by Rivera Godina, the grupero movement had its peak in the 1970s with many famous artists who were included under the label tropical music, such as Mike Laure, Rigo Tovar, Chico Che, among others, both Mexican and from other countries, who started to fuse romantic ballads with more danceable rhythms, such as Los Baby's, Los Freddy's, Los Corazones Solitarios, Los Pasteles Verdes, Los Barón de Apodaca, and Los Caminantes.
Under the influence of the music and film industries, the most well-known norteño bands became synonymous with grupero.

In the 1990s the term grupero and its variations started to be part of Mexico's music industry and began to receive media attention, including different bands such as Los Temerarios, Los Bukis, Los Tigres del Norte, Bronco, La Mafia, La Industria del Amor, Conjunto Primavera, Ana Bárbara, Grupo Bryndis, Los Acosta, Liberación, Grupo Mandigo, Mi Bande El Mexicano, Banda Machos and, as the first American artist popular on both sides of the border, Selena.
Enterprises like Televisa included bands from the grupera wave like Bronco in telenovelas such as Dos mujeres, un camino.
Later, tropical cumbia artists such as Celso Piña, Margarita la Diosa de la Cumbia, and Los Ángeles Azules would be included under the term grupera.

A turning point in the development of grupera would be the popularization of groups based on banda sinaloense mainly through Banda el Recodo and others like La Original Banda El Limón and La Arrolladora Banda El Limón.

In the early 2000s, in Mexico the term Regional Mexican began to be used. Regional Mexican music had already been used for several years in the United States to refer homogeneously to the regional variations of rural Mexican music and avoid including tropical music artists under the label. Meanwhile, Grupera came to refer specifically to the bands and solo artists that use electric guitars and basses, electronic keyboards and drums, but that played ballads, cumbias, rancheras, corridos, boleros and huapangos, with said genre being one of many styles under the umbrella term of Regional Mexican.

Awards
Latin Grammy Award for Best Grupero Album

References

External links
Gruperas.com: music
Juarol.com: Regional Mexicana

 
Regional styles of Mexican music
Latin music genres
Mexican styles of music
1980s in Latin music